Artigliere (F-582) was the lead ship of the Soldati-class frigate of the Italian Navy.

Development and design 

Iraq ordered four Lupo-class frigates from CNR in 1980 as part of a naval expansion program just before the Iran–Iraq War. These ships, which feature a telescopic hangar were completed between 1985 and 1987. Due to restrictions on arm sales to Iraq because of the Iran-Iraq War placed by the Italian prime minister Bettino Craxi, the ships remained interned in Italy until the end of that war in 1988. Iraqi President Saddam Hussein then tried to renegotiate the price of these ships (and the other ships purchased from Italy), claiming he should receive a discount due to the delay in delivery of the ships. Negotiations and court proceedings were still ongoing when Iraq invaded Kuwait in 1990 and a new arms embargo against Iraq was placed by the United Nations, again blocking the sale. In 1993 all of them were seized and, after being refitted as patrol ships, incorporated to the Italian Navy as the Soldati class in 1996. Changes made for Italian service included the removal of all ASW equipment. The Philippines considered acquiring the Soldati class in 2012.

Construction and career
Artigliere was on laid down 31 March 1982 and launched on 27 July 1983 by Fincantieri at Ancona. She was commissioned on 28 October 1994. In the early 1980s, the ship had been given the name Hittin and the pennant number F-14.

Having joined the Italian Navy, she has had an intense operational life with the participation in various operations carried out jointly with units of allied navies. The ship took part in the patrol of the Adriatic between 1995 and 2000 interspersed with a Naval Campaign in South East Asia between September 1997 and January 1998.

She then took part in Operation Active Endeavor, on several occasions, between 2002 and 2005, as part of STANAVFORMED (Naval Stationing Force in the Mediterranean) in the Eastern Mediterranean in 2002 and as part of STANAVFORLANT (Naval Stationing Force in the Atlantic) also in the Eastern Mediterranean in 2002, 2003 and 2005.

Also in May 2005, she was the command Ship of the MCMFORSOUTH, the Mine Countermeasures Force and between September and October she carried out naval training at the Naval Training Center of the Italian Navy.

In 2006, she took part in the bilateral Italian-Maltese exercise CANALE 06 in the waters of the Strait of Sicily.

On January 31, 2012 the unit was placed in RTD (Reduced Availability Table).

On December 13, 2013, at the Sottoflutto pier of the port of Castellammare di Stabia, the lowering of her flag took place. [1] The ceremony was attended by civil and military authorities, including the mayor of Castellammare di Stabia, the vice-president of the retired artillerymen association, General Genta and the Chief of Staff of the Navy Admiral De Giorgi to whom the last commander of the unit, frigate captain Paolo Casulli handed over the combat flag.

In 2015, she was mothballed in the Arsenale of La Spezia with Ardito and Audace.

Gallery

References

== External links ==

1983 ships
Lupo-class frigates
Ships built in Ancona
Ships built by Cantieri Navali del Tirreno e Riuniti